Mereret may refer to:

 Mereret (12th Dynasty), Ancient Egyptian king's daughter associated with Senusret III and Amenemhat III.
 Mereret (4th dynasty), Egyptian princess
 Mereret (Ankhu's wife), wife of vizier Ankhu.